Kroger is an American retail supermarket chain. Kroger may also refer to:

Surname Kröger (Kroeger) written without diacritics
Kroger (surname)
 The Kroger 200, a NASCAR Busch Series race held at Indianapolis Raceway Park
 The Kroger 200, a NASCAR Craftsman Truck Series race held at Martinsville Speedway
 The Kroger 250, a NASCAR Craftsman Truck Series race that takes place at Martinsville Speedway

See also